The 2017 Deutschland Cup was the 28th edition of the tournament.

Standings

Results
All times are local (UTC+1).

References

External links
Official website

Deutschland Cup
Deutschland Cup
2017
Deutschland Cup